Carolyn "Bunty" Avieson is an Australian journalist, feature writer, novelist and academic.

Career

Avieson has a PhD and a Master of Philosophy from Macquarie University, as well as an Associate Diploma of Journalism from RMIT University. In 2008–2009 she worked as a media consultant to newspaper Bhutan Observer, partly funded by the United Nations Development Program and was a consultant to Journalists Without Borders, Asia Pacific Desk. 

Avieson has published three novels, a novella and travel memoir; and been translated into Japanese, German and Thai. She is the recipient of two Ned Kelly Awards. In the 1990s she was editorial director of mass market women's magazines Woman's Day and New Idea. She is a senior lecturer in journalism and media at the University of Sydney.

Awards 

 2002 – Ned Kelly Awards – winner of the Best First Novel and Reader's Vote, for Apartment 255
 2003 – shortlisted for Ned Kelly Crime Writing Awards – Best Novel for The Affair
 2004 – shortlisted for Ned Kelly Crime Writing Awards – Best Novel for The Wrong Door
 2011 – Dean's HDR Award 
 2013 – Vice Chancellor's Commendation for PhD thesis

Bibliography

Novels
 Apartment 255 (2002)
 The Affair (2003) Review
 The Wrong Door (2004) Review
 Once You Know (2005)

Travel writing
 Baby in a Backpack Through Bhutan (2004) Review
 The Dragon Finds Its Voice (2013)

Documentary writing
 A Story from Bhutan: The Making of "Travellers & Magicians" (2004)

Personal life 
Avieson's partner is the film producer Mal Watson, who made The Cup and Travellers & Magicians, with writer/director Khyentse Norbu. Avieson and Watson have a daughter, Kathryn, who was the baby in the travel book Baby in a Backpack to Bhutan. They live in Sydney. Avieson's father was the late Associate Professor John Avieson, one of Australia's first journalism academics, who authored several books, including Applied Journalism in Australia and Editing Australian Newspapers.

References

External links
 Bunty Avieson website
 
Ned Kelly Awards

Year of birth missing (living people)
Living people
Australian journalists
Australian women novelists
Australian travel writers
Australian crime fiction writers
Women travel writers
Ned Kelly Award winners
20th-century Australian novelists
20th-century Australian women writers
Women mystery writers
Macquarie University alumni
RMIT University alumni
Academic staff of the University of Sydney